Canton station may refer to:

Canton station (Illinois)
Canton station (Minnesota)
Canton station (Ohio)
Canton Center station, Massachusetts